Merited Artist of Albania was a state honorary title for the decoration of outstanding art performers of People's Socialist Republic of Albania. It was created by law in 1960 and amended in 1980. The title was no longer given in Albania after the law was amended in 1996.

Definition
The title is the state award of Albania that was given for the personal merit in Albania to the citizens that worked in their respective artistic field as a rule of no less than ten (10) years obtaining high on-the-job achievements and professional mastery.

Conditions
The title was awarded by the President of Albania. It was given to citizens of Albania, foreigners, and persons with no citizenship. This title was lower than the People's Artist of Albania which could only be awarded ten (10) years after obtaining the Merited Artist of Albania. This title was not awarded posthumously.

Title recipients

The Merited Artist of Albania title could only be awarded to motion picture directors; actors of theatres, films, and circus; singers; members of professional ensembles and chorus'; orchestral conductors; composers; musicians; TV and Radio network broadcasters for their highly executed mastery, creating a highly artistic images, performances, motion movies that became a property of the native culturally artistic heritage.

The recipients were also awarded a badge and a certificate. The presentation was conducted publicly. To be noted that all the People's Artist of Albania were recipients of the Merited Artist of Albania recognition first. Past recipients of the Merited Artist of Albania recognition include the following (by field of merit):

Music

Singers
 Liljana Kondakçi
 Eli Fara

Composers and music directors
 Tish Daija
 Agim Krajka
 Limoz Dizdari
 Simon Gjoni
 Tonin Harapi
 Aleksandër Peçi
 Nikolla Zoraqi
 Gjon Simoni

Theater and cinematography

Actors
 Albert Vërria
 Andon Qesari
 Drita Pelingu
 Esma Agolli
 Marie Logoreci
 Mirush Kabashi
 Ndrek Luca
 Ndricim Xhepa
 Reshat Arbana
 Roland Trebicka
 Yllka Mujo

Cinematographers
 Kujtim Çashku
 Dhimitër Anagnosti

Art

Painters
Sotir Capo
Sadik Kaceli
Agim Zajmi

See also 
Orders, decorations and medals of Albania
People's Artist of Albania

References

 
Title
Awards established in 1960
1960 establishments in Albania